Major General Carl Dodd ( 1942 – 18 September 2018) was an Irish Army officer who served as Chief of Staff of the United Nations Truce Supervision Organization (UNTSO) from 2002 to 2004.

Early life
Dodd was born in Mallow, County Cork, and moved from there in 1961 to join the Cadet School of the Military College in the Curragh, County Kildare.

Military career
Throughout his career, Dodd held senior appointments as Commandant of the Military College, Commanding Officer of the 3rd Infantry Battalion and Director of Operations. In September 1999 he was promoted to major general and took up the appointment of Deputy Chief of Staff (Operations). In 2002, Kofi Annan, the UN Secretary-General, appointed Dodd as Chief of Staff of the United Nations Truce Supervision Organization (UNTSO) in Jerusalem.

Personal life
Dodd was married and lived (when not posted abroad) in Newbridge, County Kildare. He died on 18 September 2018.

References

2018 deaths
Irish Army generals
People from County Cork
Year of birth missing
1940s births
Military personnel from County Cork